Qaleh Jiq (also Romanized as Qal‘eh Jīq and Qal‘ehjīq; also known as Qal‘eh Bīq, Qal‘eh Jeq, Qal’eh Jūq, and Qal‘eh-ye Jūq) is a village in Dikleh Rural District, Hurand District, Ahar County, East Azerbaijan Province, Iran. At the 2006 census, its population was 50, in 14 families.

References 

Populated places in Ahar County